Marcel Voisin (1892–1981) was a French grocer and anarchist

Life 

Born in Tours on 26 September 1892 to a seamstress and shoemaker, Voisin left school to apprentice as a butcher, court clerk, a car painter, and an itinerant worker. After hearing Sébastien Faure speak, he joined him in La Ruche, where he worked as a handyman between 1912 and 1915. He later kept the shop for Faure's periodical, Ce qu’il faut dire. Voisin also supported Louis Lecoin

In the postwar period through 1971, he managed a general food store. He spent the rest of his life traveling, writing poems, and writing his memoirs, despite being nearly blind. He remained a pacifist and anarchist through the end of his life. He died in Paris on 31 January 1981.

References

Further reading 

 Thierry Maricourt, Histoire de la littérature libertaire en France, Albin Michel, 1990, page 143.
 Alain Faure, Claire Lévy-Vroelant, Hôtels meublés et garnis de Paris. 1860-1990, Éditions Créaphis, 2007, Sources et bibliographie, page 13.
 Renaud Violet, Régénération humaine et éducation libertaire. L’influence du néo-malthusianisme français sur les expériences pédagogiques libertaires avant 1914, Strasbourg II (M.A.), 2002.

1892 births
1981 deaths
French anarchists